Buttoners is a 1997 Czech film directed by Petr Zelenka.

Cast
Pavel Zajíček - Presenter of Radio 1
Jan Haubert - Guest of Radio 1
Seisuke Tsukahara - Japanese man with Glasses
Motohiro Hosoya - Japanese man with Beard
Junzo Inokuchi - Young Japanese man

Awards
Buttoners was awarded the 1997 Czech Lion for Best Film.

 The Tiger award at the Rotterdam IFF, 1997

References

External links
 

1997 films
Czech comedy films
Films directed by Petr Zelenka
Czech Lion Awards winners (films)
Golden Kingfisher winners
Czech anthology films